Ali El-Khatib (born 18 March 1989) is a Palestinian professional footballer who plays for Maccabi Ahi Nazareth and the Palestine national team.

Club career 
El-Khatib grew up in the Arab city of Shefa-'Amr in Northern Israel where he played for local side, Hapoel Shefa-'Amr.

He was brought to Palestinian club Jabal Al-Mukaber in by the coach, Samir Issa, in 2012. While playing for them, a controversy erupted over El-Khatib's contract.

Hapoel Haifa had given him a trial after someone had informed the coach of El-Khatib's talents. He was then chosen to join the club after 5 or 10 minutes of his try-out.

However, the signing caused an outrage with his previous club, who alleged that he had three-and-a-half years left on his contract, resulting in them taking the case to FIFA after a Tel Aviv District Court denied their appeal. El-Khatib denied that he signed a contract with the club, claiming that they had forged his signature on the contract. The president of Jabal Al-Mukaber compared Hapoel's action to that of a horse thief under the pretence that they stole a player who was under contract.

Hapoel Haifa
In a league match on April 1, 2012, he was involved in a mass brawl in which he was assaulted by staff members. The match, which was against Maccabi Petah Tikva, had ended with a free-kick goal for the hosts, Maccabi Petah Tikva. Immediately after the final whistle, the players went at each other.

Petah Tikva's goalkeeping coach, Ami Ganish, had unprovokingly headbutted El-Khatib which knocked him down. Afterwards, Yigal Maman, a high-ranking employee kicked him in the head while he was on the ground, causing him to lose consciousness.

El-Khatib had to be taken to the hospital and was treated for a fractured jaw and missing teeth. The two members of staff were detained by police.

Maccabi Netanya
In June 2012 it was announced that Ali El-Khatib has joined Maccabi Netanya.

International career 
As one of a growing number of Arab-Israelis playing professionally in the WBPL and representing Palestine internationally . He stated his dream is to play for Israel, and also said "It would be wonderful if one day the Palestinian national team could play against the Israeli national team. Then I would play the first half of the game with one team and the second half with the other team."

He received his first national team cap against Thailand in 2014 World Cup qualifying on July 23, 2011. He scored his first senior team goal in a friendly match against Bahrain, the 67th-minute goal proved to be the winner as the game ended 1–0. 11 days later, he scored his second goal in a crucial match against Sudan which secured Palestine passage to the 2011 Pan Arab Games semifinal.

Career statistics

Club

International 
As of 31 January 2012

Honours 
West Bank Premier League
Winner (1): 2009–10
Runner-up (1): 2010–11

References

External links 
 

1989 births
Living people
Footballers from Shefa-'Amr
People from Shefa-'Amr
Arab citizens of Israel
Arab-Israeli footballers
Israeli footballers
Palestinian footballers
Palestine international footballers
Maccabi Shlomi Nahariya F.C. players
Maccabi Ironi Tamra F.C. players
Jabal Al-Mukaber Club players
Hilal Al-Quds Club players
Hapoel Haifa F.C. players
Maccabi Netanya F.C. players
Hapoel Acre F.C. players
Maccabi Ahi Nazareth F.C. players
Hapoel Hadera F.C. players
Israeli Premier League players
Liga Leumit players
Footballers at the 2010 Asian Games
Association football midfielders
Asian Games competitors for Israel